The Portugal men's national water polo team is the representative for Portugal in international men's water polo. Portugal has contested water polo at the Olympics once, in 1952, when they were eliminated in the first round.

Results

Olympic Games
1952 — 20th place

External links

Water polo
Men's national water polo teams
National water polo teams in Europe
National water polo teams by country
 
Men's sport in Portugal